Victor Cosson (11 October 1915 – 18 June 2009) was a French professional road bicycle racer from 1937 to 1950. In his second year as a professional cyclist, he finished third in the 1938 Tour de France. His biggest victory was the Paris–Camembert edition of 1943. He was born in Lorges.

Major results

1938
Tour de France:
3rd place overall classification
1943
Paris–Camembert

References

External links 

Official Tour de France results for Victor Cosson

French male cyclists
1915 births
2009 deaths
Sportspeople from Loir-et-Cher
Cyclists from Centre-Val de Loire